Riitta Jallinoja (née Haantie born 1943) is a Finnish sociologist, who was appointed Finland's first family sociology professor at the University of Helsinki in 2002. She is known, among other things, for studying the role of women, the family and modern life.

Jallinoja completed her PhD in sociology at the University of Helsinki in 1983, with a dissertation entitled "" (Finnish women's movement fighting seasons). Jallinoja has published several books on the subject of the changing dynamics of the family and participated in numerous international research projects in the field of family sociology.

Jallinoja has been acknowledged in the national scientific publication, as well as being presented with the JV Snellman and Elsa Enäjärvi-Haavio Awards. She is currently the Vice Dean of Faculty of Social Sciences. Her husband is an architect Reijo Jallinoja.

Jallinoja elected to the Finnish Academy of Science and a member in 2001.

Selected works

External links
 WorldCat published works

References

1943 births
Living people
Finnish sociologists
Finnish women sociologists
Women educators
Finnish educators
University of Helsinki alumni
Finnish writers
Finnish women writers
Finnish women academics